John A. Osborn (1939–2000) was an inorganic chemist who made many contributions to organometallic chemistry.  Obsorn received his PhD under the mentorship of Geoffrey Wilkinson.  During that degree Osborn contributed to the development of Wilkinson's catalyst.  His thesis studies ranged widely.
 
In 1967, he took a faculty position at Harvard University.  At Harvard, he supervised the PhD theses of Richard Schrock, John Shapley, and Jay Labinger.  During this time, the chemistry of [M(diene)(PR3)2]+ was advanced (M = Rh, Ir), laying the foundation for many subsequent developments.  In 1975, Osborn took a faculty position at the University of Louis Pasteur, where he further broadened his research.

References

1939 births
2000 deaths
Alumni of Imperial College London
20th-century British chemists
Inorganic chemists